Estádio Maximino Porpino Filho or Modelão, as it is usually called, is a stadium located in Castanhal, Brazil. It is used mostly for football matches and hosts the home matches of Castanhal. The stadium has a maximum capacity of 5,000 people.

References

External links
Estádio Maximino Porpino Filho on OGol
Estádio Maximino Porpino Filho on Federação Paraense de Futebol

Football venues in Pará